Armenian Heritage Park is a memorial park dedicated to the victims of the Armenian genocide located on Parcel 13 on the Rose Kennedy Greenway between Faneuil Hall Marketplace and Christopher Columbus Park in Boston, Massachusetts.

The Park includes an abstract sculpture, split dodecahedron, that sits on a reflecting pool.

The abstract sculpture has 24–26 different configurations, which symbolize the dispersion and coming together of immigrants from different shores. 
The abstract sculpture is dedicated to lives lost during the Armenian genocide of 1915–1923 and all genocides that have followed.

The other part of it is a grass labyrinth that not only pays tribute to the contribution to the United States, but also represents the journey of life.

The Armenian Heritage Foundation, composed of dozens of Armenian-American religious, cultural, and other organizations from around Massachusetts, raised from $5 million to $6 million for the park.

The groundbreaking ceremony on September 9, 2010, was attended by Governor Deval Patrick, Karekin II, Catholicos of All Armenians, Registrar of Motor Vehicles Rachel Kaprielian, Sheriff of Middlesex County Peter Koutoujian, Boston Mayor Thomas Menino and many Armenian-American citizens and City and Commonwealth officials. Governor Patrick said that the park will be a "beautiful addition to the Greenway as well as a testament to the heritage of Armenian-Americans and Massachusetts' larger immigrant history". Mayor Menino also noted that the park "celebrates the distinctive history of the City of Boston and the generations of immigrants who have made Boston the wonderfully diverse community it is today".

Construction of the park was expected to be completed within 12 months, but actually lasted over a year and the park was opened on May 22, 2012. Armenian Minister of Foreign Affairs Eduard Nalbandyan and Governor Deval Patrick joined hundreds of attendees from the Armenian community at the dedication of the park.
 
In "On the Greenway, public arts that feels alive", Joanna Weiss, columnist for The Boston Globe, Opinion, April 11, 2015, wrote, "The Abstract Sculpture at Armenian Heritage Park "might well be the gem of the Greenway so far; an example of public art that is both permanent and alive"

On July 31, 2022, Armenian singer-songwriter Maléna, winner of the Junior Eurovision Song Contest 2021, performed her winning track "Qami Qami" at the park.

Gallery

See also
List of Armenian genocide memorials
Armenian American
List of places named after Armenia

References

Armenian genocide memorials
Armenian-American culture in Massachusetts
Landmarks in Boston
Protected areas established in 2010
2010 establishments in Massachusetts